Xizmo Media Productions LLC v. City of New York is a pending United States federal court case where the company Xizmo Media Productions argues that the City of New York's "Avigation" law, which in effect is a ban on unmanned aerial vehicles (commonly known as "drones") within New York City, violates the First Amendment to the United States Constitution. Xizmo argues that New York City's drone ban renders an "inability [for Xizmo] to gather aerial imagery interfering with its directors’ artistic expression". The lawsuit, which is taking place in the United States District Court for the Eastern District of New York, will be decided by federal judge Eric N. Vitaliano.

Background 
New York City passed its "Avigation" law in 1948, which stated:It shall be unlawful for any person avigating an aircraft to take off or land, except in an emergency, at any place within the limits of the city other than places of landing designated by the department of transportation or the port of New York authority.New York City's website additionally advises that people who see drones within New York call 9-1-1. Xizmo argues that the Federal Aviation Administration, not the City of New York, has jurisdiction over all airspace in the country, and by extension the airspace over New York City, and only it can enact restrictions on where drones can be flown. Xizmo has previously been cited by New York City police for failure to obey the New York City drone ban. Despite its operators having a part 107 remote pilot certificate, various FAA waivers, and an FAA permit to operate small UAVs "in class B airspace under the jurisdiction of New York's Kennedy Airport Control and LaGuardia Airport Traffic Control", Xizmo was cited and fined under the Avigation law, which it argues the City's interpretation is excessively "expansive".

The core of Xizmo's argument is that New York City's drone ban not only violates FAA precedent, but violates the First Amendment by excessively restricting the right to artistic expression through the use of drones for the purpose of aerial photography and videography.

Failed motion to dismiss 
New York City initially attempted to dismiss the lawsuit, arguing that given the presence of skyscrapers and tall buildings within the city, the safety of its residents would be jeopardized by drones. Judge Vitaliano, however, declined the motion to dismiss, arguing that "just as holding a protest calling for “an end to the violence and conflict in communities of color” on Randall’s Island cannot communicate the same message as holding the identical protest march on Malcolm X Boulevard in Harlem, filming in the five remote Brooklyn, Queens, and Staten Island locations cannot communicate the same message as filming in Manhattan." Brendan Schulman, an executive at Boston Dynamics and the former vice president of policy at drone manufacturer DJI, posted Vitaliano's decision on Twitter.

See also 

 RaceDayQuads v. FAA, a case which unsuccessfully challenged the FAA's Remote ID rule

References

External links 
 Failed motion to dismiss by New York City

United States lawsuits
Unmanned aerial vehicles